John Farnsworth Wright (15 October 1929 – 19 November 2001) was a British economist. He published the book Britain in the Age of Economic Management. He was a skeptic on government interventions in the economy.

He was born in Sheffield in 1929 and educated at King Edward VII School, specializing in math and physics for which he won a Hastings Scholarship to The Queen's College, Oxford, in 1947. Wright then spent two years in the National Service in the Royal Army Education Corps, and it was during this time that he studied philosophy, politics, and economics. He then began at Nuffield College, Oxford in 1952 as an early student.

He was appointed Fellow of Trinity College, Oxford, in 1953; he was Tutor in Economics 1953–1990, Official Fellow 1955–1957, Estates Bursar 1955–1997, and became an Emeritus Fellow in 1998.

Sources
Author and Bookinfo.com

References

External links
Obituary

1929 births
2001 deaths
British economists
People with Parkinson's disease
People educated at King Edward VII School, Sheffield
Fellows of Trinity College, Oxford
Alumni of The Queen's College, Oxford